James Fielding Hinkle (October 20, 1862March 26, 1951) was an American banker, politician and the sixth governor of New Mexico.

Early life 
Hinkle was born in Franklin County, Missouri on October 20, 1862. He studied at the University of Missouri. In 1885 he moved to New Mexico and established a successful business career.

Politics 
He served as a member of the Lincoln County Board of Commissioners from 1891 to 1893 and also served as a member of the New Mexico Territorial House of Representatives from 1893 to 1896. He became a member of the New Mexico Territorial Senate in 1901 and served as a member of the Lincoln County Board of Equalization from 1901 to 1911. He served as the mayor of Roswell from 1904 to 1906. He then served in the New Mexico State Senate from 1912 to 1917.

He was elected the Governor of New Mexico by a popular vote on November 7, 1922. During his term, a First World War veteran's property tax exemption was sanctioned. He was the Governor of New Mexico from January 1, 1923 to January 1, 1925.

Hinkle was later elected as New Mexico Commissioner of Public Lands in 1931 and served a single two-year term.

Later years 
After leaving the office, he remained active in business. He died in Roswell, New Mexico on March 26, 1951. In 1964, he was inducted into the Hall of Great Westerners of the National Cowboy & Western Heritage Museum for his contribution to the cattle industry.

References 

 Sobel, Robert, and John Raimo, eds. Biographical Directory of the Governors of the United States, 1789–1978 (1978). Vol 4.

1862 births
1951 deaths
American cattlemen
Methodists from New Mexico
County commissioners in New Mexico
Members of the New Mexico Territorial Legislature
Democratic Party governors of New Mexico
New Mexico Commissioners of Public Lands
Democratic Party New Mexico state senators
Mayors of places in New Mexico
People from Franklin County, Missouri
University of Missouri alumni
People from Lincoln County, New Mexico
People from Roswell, New Mexico